Alan Wynne Williams (born 21 December 1945) is a British Labour politician.

Williams was born in Carmarthen. He studied at Carmarthen Grammar School and Jesus College, Oxford. He was elected Member of Parliament for Carmarthen in 1987. Following constituency boundary changes in 1997, his seat was renamed Carmarthen East and Dinefwr. In 2001, however, he lost his seat to the Plaid Cymru candidate Adam Price.

References

External links 
 

1945 births
Living people
Alumni of Jesus College, Oxford
Welsh Labour Party MPs
UK MPs 1987–1992
UK MPs 1992–1997
UK MPs 1997–2001
People educated at Carmarthen Grammar School
Members of the Parliament of the United Kingdom for Carmarthenshire constituencies

20th-century Welsh politicians
21st-century Welsh politicians